Maria Flor Leite Calaça (born August 31, 1983), usually known as Maria Flor, is a Brazilian actress.

Career
She was discovered in 2002, and her first role was in the film O Diabo a Quatro, filmed in the same year, and released nationwide in Brazil in 2005. It was also her first role as a protagonist in a movie. She became famous after her role as Rê, a very insecure and innovative character, in Malhação telenovela. This was also her first television role.

She played Tina, a romantic character, in the telenovela Cabocla. To be able to play her character, Maria Flor spent almost a month in a farm learning how to be a peasant. In the movie Cazuza - O Tempo Não Pára she played a groupie following the rock band Barão Vermelho. In the film Quase Dois Irmãos she played a wealthy girl, daughter of a politician, and that gets involved with a drug dealer. She also represented the cast of the film during the 2005 Créteil International Women's Film Festival.

She played a sex-worker in the movie O Diabo a Quatro. In her research to play this character she talked to real-life sex-workers. Maria Flor won the best actress award of the Festival de Cuiabá (Cuiabá Film Festival) for her performance in this film. In the biographical film Dois Filhos de Francisco, Maria Flor played Solange, who was the first love of the sertanejo singer Zezé Di Camargo, of the Zezé Di Camargo & Luciano duo.

She played Taís Junqueira in the telenovela Belíssima, which started airing in November, 2005. Taís Junqueira is a Brazilian woman working in Greece as a prostitute, after receiving a proposal promising her a job as a ballerina. During the telenovela, her character tried to return to Brazil. In 2006, she played Carol in the 2006 film Podecre!  and Letícia in the movie Proibido Proibir.

Maria Flor played the role of Bel in the 2007 film The Ballroom  Her first role as the main character of a telenovela was in the 2007 telenovela Eterna Magia, where she played the role of Nina Sullivan, who is a witch who refuses to use her magical abilities. In 2008, she participated of one episode of the TV series Casos e Acasos, and starred the end of the year special Aline.

Her international career started in the Fernando Meirelles film 360, starring Anthony Hopkins, Rachel Weisz and Jude Law.

Besides working as an actress, Maria Flor starred the summer campaign for Blue Man, a bikini and bermuda shorts factory.

Personal life
Maria Flor was born in Laranjeiras, Rio de Janeiro. She is the daughter of Renato Calaça, a cinema audio technician and Márcia Leite, who is a screenwriter.

Filmography

References

External links
 
Maria Flor Interview at Terra (in Portuguese)
Interview at Mulheres do Cinema Brasileiro Website (in Portuguese)

1983 births
Living people
Actresses from Rio de Janeiro (city)
Brazilian television actresses
Brazilian film actresses
Brazilian telenovela actresses
20th-century Brazilian actresses
21st-century Brazilian actresses